William Orman Beeman is an American scholar whose specialty is the Middle East; he is a professor of anthropology at the University of Minnesota, where he is Chair of the Department of Anthropology. He has authored many articles and fourteen books on Iranian politics, theatre, language, and culture.

About
Born in Manhattan, Kansas. Beeman was trained as a linguistic anthropologist at Wesleyan University and in 1976 he received his Ph.D from University of Chicago.

Beeman is a professor of anthropology at the University of Minnesota, where he is Chair of the Department of Anthropology. For many years he was Professor of Anthropology; Theatre, Speech and Dance; and East Asian Studies at Brown University. From 1976 until 1979, Beeman worked with the Center for Traditional Performing Arts in Tehran, and at the Reza Shah Kabir University (now known as University of Mazandaran) in the Institute of Social and Cultural Sciences.

Beeman's book, The "Great Satan" vs. the "Mad Mullahs": How the United States and Iran Demonize Each Other (2008), deals with the highly negative rhetoric and discourse between Iran and the United States over the three decades since the Iranian Revolution, and its effects on national attitudes toward the Bush administration's policy towards Iran, as well as the possibility of military conflict between the two nations. His publication is Iranian Performance Traditions which treats indigenous performance traditions of Iran. An important aspect of Beeman's work has been in the field of performance studies, particularly the study of non-Western theatrical traditions. In Iran, this includes the Iranian ritual passion drama, ta'ziyeh and the comic improvisatory theatre tradition, ru-howzi. He has also studied traditional performance in Japan, China and South Asia. His interest in the art world is also shown in his contribution to the co-authored volume Object, Image and Inquiry: The Art Historian at Work.  

An admirer of the late anthropologist, Margaret Mead, Beeman has edited seven volumes of her post-World War II papers, having written scholarly introductions for several of them, including The Study of Culture at a Distance, and Studying Contemporary Western Society: Method and Theory.

He is also a professional opera singer, from 1996 until 1999 he sang operatic bass in Europe. In 2014 he married his husband Frank Farris, though the two have been a couple since 1984.

Publications

See also 
 Persian theatre

References

External links
 Beeman's weblog: Culture and International Affairs
 William O. Beeman published papers op-eds and lectures

American anthropologists
Cultural anthropologists
Linguists from the United States
Brown University faculty
Iranologists
American foreign policy writers
American male non-fiction writers
American male stage actors
American opera singers
University of Minnesota faculty
Wesleyan University alumni
University of Chicago alumni
Year of birth missing (living people)
Living people